Parikka is a Finnish surname. Notable people with the surname include:

 Jalmari Parikka (1891–1959), Finnish revolutionary soldier, actor and artistic director
 Lauri Parikka (1895–1965), Finnish painter
 Pekka Parikka (1939–1997), Finnish film director and screenwriter
 Jussi Parikka, Finnish new media theorist
 Jarno Parikka (born 1986), Finnish footballer
 Valtteri Parikka (born 1994), Finnish ice hockey defenceman

Finnish-language surnames